The Player is a Thai action suspense drama television series, starring Way-ar Sangngern (Joss), Ramida Jiranorraphat (Jane) and Tipnaree Weerawatnodom (Namtan). The show follows a group of high-society people who engage in a devious game in order to bet for their popularity, fortune, and love, which ends to a suspected murder. The rich's life is not quite as idyllic as it appears. In such a short period, it might turn quite dark. What happens when one of them begins a game of life that escalates to a murder and discloses those dark secrets?

Directed by Tichakorn Phukhaotong (Jojo) and it was one of the sixteen television series produced by the GMMTV under "GMMTV 2021: The New Decade Begins" event on 3 December 2020, it is distributed by streaming app Viu, it started to air on 20 December 2021 and continues every Monday and Tuesdays at 20:30 (8:30 pm) on GMM25, replacing Irresistable on its timeslot, and on the above-mentioned international streaming platform at 22:30 (10:30 pm). The official trailer was released by the GMMTV on 7 December 2021, with the official characters and casts also being revealed.

Plot 
The Player starts off with the climax of Miriam having an altercation with multiple members of a high society group at a party - namely Matt, Pitch, Giwi, Eve and Tim. Following Miriam's disappearance after the party, inspector Tin investigates the different high society members and uncovers not just their dark secrets, but also the truth behind a seemingly unrelated murder case.

Casts and characters

Main 
 Way-ar Sangngern (Joss) as Tim
 Ramida Jiranorraphat (Jane) as Eve
 Tipnaree Weerawatnodom (Namtan) as Giwi
 Patara Eksangkul (Foei) as Pitch
 Jirakit Thawornwong (Mek) as Matt
 Phatchara Thabthong (Kapook) as Miriam
 Wachirawit Ruangwiwat (Chimon) as Dan
 Tawan Vihokratana (Tay) as Tin

Supporting 
 Nawat Phumphotingam (White)
 Patharawarin Timkul (May)
 Sattabut Laedeke (Drake)
 Sueangsuda Lawanprasert (Namfon)
 Supoj Janjareonborn (Lift)
 Naphon Phromsuwan
 Pattamawan Kaomulkadee (Yui)

Reception

Thailand television ratings 
In the table below,  represents the lowest ratings and  represents the highest ratings.

 Based on the average audience share per episode.

References

External links 
 The Player on GMM 25 website 
 The Player on Viu website 

Television series by GMMTV
2021 Thai television series debuts
2022 Thai television series endings